Iván Santiago Díaz (born 23 January 1993) is an Argentine footballer, who last played for Ararat Yerevan.

Career

Early career
Diaz started his career 2003 with River Plate, before joined in August 2011 to Greece side Panathinaikos Athens.

AS Trenčín
On 8 February 2012, Díaz has signed 4-year contract with AS Trenčín. His debut came on 24 March 2012 in a Corgoň Liga match against Slovan Bratislava, entering as a substitute in place of Samuel Štefánik. After 19 games in the Corgoň Liga for AS Trenčín, he returned to River Plate, in February 2013. In winter 2013, he left the club without explanation.

Ararat Yerevan
On 26 July 2021, Díaz signed for Armenian Premier League club Ararat Yerevan. On 1 August 2022, Ararat Yerevan announced that Díaz had left the club at the end of his contract.

Honours

MŠK Žilina
Fortuna Liga: Winners: 2016-17

References

External links
AS Trenčín profile 

1993 births
Living people
Argentine footballers
Argentine expatriate footballers
Association football midfielders
AS Trenčín players
MŠK Žilina players
FC Viktoria Plzeň players
ŠKF Sereď players
FC Ararat Yerevan players
Slovak Super Liga players
Czech First League players
Armenian Premier League players
Expatriate footballers in Slovakia
Expatriate footballers in the Czech Republic
Expatriate footballers in Armenia
Argentine expatriate sportspeople in Slovakia
Argentine expatriate sportspeople in the Czech Republic
Argentine expatriate sportspeople in Armenia